Regional Transit District may refer to:

 Sacramento Regional Transit District
 San Joaquin Regional Transit District